Winningen is a municipality in the district of Mayen-Koblenz in Rhineland-Palatinate, western Germany.

People 
 August Horch (1868-1951), German automobile pioneer and industrialist
  Horst Schulze (1929-), German founder of The Ritz Carlton Hotel Company, and the Capella Hotel Group

References

Municipalities in Rhineland-Palatinate
Mayen-Koblenz
Districts of the Rhine Province